The G-class was a class of six trams built by Duncan & Fraser, Adelaide, for the Prahran & Malvern Tramways Trust (PMTT). All passed to the Melbourne & Metropolitan Tramways Board on 2 February 1920 when it took over the PMTT, becoming the G-class and retaining their running numbers. They were similar to the F-class but had arched rather than clerestory roofs.

References

Melbourne tram vehicles